Vinyl Confessions is the eighth studio album by American rock band Kansas, released in 1982 (see 1982 in music). It includes "Play the Game Tonight", which broke the Top 20 and is Kansas's third highest-charting single, surpassed only by "Carry on Wayward Son" and "Dust in the Wind". The album was reissued in remastered format on CD in 1996 on Legacy/Epic and again in 2011.

Background
Vinyl Confessions was a major turning point for the band. After the conversion of both guitarist/keyboard player Kerry Livgren and bass player Dave Hope to Christianity, and the focus that Livgren placed on his religion in the band's lyrics, lead singer Steve Walsh did not agree with the new direction of the band and left to form his own band, Streets. Walsh had also contributed much as a songwriter, so the band was forced to find a new lead singer who not only had a vocal style that fit the band's music, but also could contribute material for the upcoming album. After a long audition process, the choice came down to three strong candidates: Warren Ham, Michael Gleason and John Elefante. The band eventually settled on Elefante.

"Fair Exchange" described the world under the rule of the Anti-Christ, while "Chasing Shadows" pointed out the frustration in seeking anything outside Biblical truth. "Diamonds and Pearls" emphasized the value of spiritual wealth over financial wealth, while "Face It", "Windows" and "Borderline" all had strong evangelistic appeals to the listener. The album's closer, "Crossfire", made the album's position abundantly clear in its indirect reference to Jesus Christ ("the one who rose").

Vinyl Confessions did not go unnoticed by the nascent Contemporary Christian music (CCM) industry, which was just coming into its own at that time. Numerous Christian magazines trumpeted Kansas' new musical direction, and CCM Magazine even chose Vinyl Confessions as the No. 1 CCM album of 1982. All this attention created an entirely new audience of listeners for Kansas, but it also created further tensions within the band. Those tensions came to a head during the recording of their next album, Drastic Measures.

Vinyl Confessions was also the last album with violinist/vocalist Robby Steinhardt, who left the band after the supporting tour and did not return until 1997.

Reception

While acknowledging the comeback success of the single "Play the Game Tonight", AllMusic's retrospective review was largely negative. They criticized the Christian lyrics as being "often of a judgmental, us-versus-you nature", and insinuated that the album fell more into a generic pop rock vein than Kansas's earlier albums ("it was getting hard to distinguish Kansas from Foreigner and Journey").

Track listing

Personnel
Kansas
 John Elefante — keyboards, lead vocals
 Kerry Livgren — guitar, keyboards, Synclavier programming
 Robby Steinhardt — violin, vocals, lead vocals
 Rich Williams — guitar
 Dave Hope — bass
 Phil Ehart — drums

Additional musicians
 Warren Ham — harmonica
 Bill Bergman — alto saxophone, tenor saxophone on tracks 2, 5 and 6
 Lee Thornburg, John Berry, Jr. — trumpets on tracks 2 and 5
 Greg Smith — baritone saxophone on tracks 2 and 5
 Jim Coile — tenor saxophone on tracks 2 and 5
 Ben Dahlke — bassoon on track 5
 David Pack, Donna Williams — background vocals
 Roger Taylor — background vocals on "Right Away", "Diamonds and Pearls", "Play the Game Tonight"

Production
 Kansas – producer
 Ken Scott – producer, engineer
 Brian Leshon, David Spritz, Phil Jost, Ralph Sutton – assistant engineers
 Stan Ricker – mastering at Original Masteringworks/Mobile Fidelity Sound Lab, California
 Tom Drennon - art direction and design
 Andrew Barnum - additional art
 Glen Wexler - photography

Charts
 

Album

Singles

References

Kansas (band) albums
1982 albums
Albums produced by Ken Scott
Epic Records albums
Legacy Recordings albums